The Cautionary Towns were three strategic Dutch ports which under the 1585 Treaty of Nonsuch were held by English troops as security for assistance provided by Elizabeth I during the Eighty Years' War against Spain. They included Brielle or Briel, Vlissingen, generally known to the English as Flushing, and Fort Rammekens on the nearby island of Walcheren.

Background

English and Scottish volunteers serving with the Dutch Protestants against Spain helped capture Brielle, Rammekens and Vlissingen in 1572 and garrisoned them soon after. When the Anglo-Spanish War began in 1585, it was important to keep these strategic ports out of Spanish hands. 

In the Treaty of Nonsuch, the Dutch effectively ceded control of the three ports to Elizabeth I as security for her assistance and it was agreed that England would garrison them at its own expense. Elizabeth's favourite, Robert Sidney, 1st Earl of Leicester was made governor of Vlissingen in 1588, with Thomas Cecil, 1st Earl of Exeter, appointed governor of Brielle; he was succeeded by Edward Conway, 1st Viscount Conway who named his daughter Brilliana in honour of the city.

When the 1604 Treaty of London ended the Anglo-Spanish War, the Spanish demanded the Cautionary Towns be returned to them but the English refused. Philip III of Spain eventually conceded the point, having decided their neutrality permitted him to gain access to the English Channel. This presented a threat to the Dutch and when it became apparent the 1609 Twelve Years' Truce would not be renewed, they sought to recover the towns; with James I unwilling to recall Parliament and thus short of funds, the Dutch ambassador was authorised to offer up to £250,000 for their purchase. In May 1616, they agreed a price of £213,000. 

During the Third Anglo-Dutch War in 1672, when a combined attack by Charles II of England and Louis XIV of France brought the Dutch close to defeat, Charles demanded the permanent cession of Brielle, Vlissingen and Sluys to England. However, the Dutch rejected these terms and their position soon recovered.

References

Sources
 
 
  
 
 
 
 
 

Elizabethan era
Eighty Years' War (1566–1609)
Tudor England
1585 in law
Anglo-Spanish War (1585–1604)